Andro Wekua (born 1977) is a Georgian artist based in Zurich, Switzerland, and Berlin, Germany.

Wekua was born in Sokhumi and witnessed an ethnic conflict in Abkhazia in the 1990s. His father, the Georgian political activist Vova Wekua, was killed by the Abkhaz nationalists during the 1989 Sukhumi riots. His work encompasses painting, collage, drawing, installation, sculpture, and film.

Selected exhibitions

2011

Pink Wave Hunter, Kunsthalle Fridericianum, Kassel, cur. Rein Wolfs (solo show) 
A Neon Shadow,  Castello Di Rivoli, Turin (solo show)
Never sleep with a strawberry in your mouth, Kunsthalle Wien, Vienna (solo show)
Preis der Nationalgalerie für junge Kunst 2011, Hamburger Bahnhof, Berlin 
ILLUMInations, 54th Venice Biennale 2011, Venice 

2010

10,000 Lives, the 8th Gwangju Biennale, Gwangju, cur. Massimiliano Gioni 
Skin Fruit: Selections from the Dakis Joannou Collection, New Museum, New York, cur. Jeff Koons 
Abstract Resistance, Walker Art Center, Minneapolis, cur. Yasmil Raymond
Contemplating the Void: Interventions in the Guggenheim Museum, Solomon R. Guggenheim Museum, New York, cur. Nancy Spector
1995, Gladstone Gallery, Brussels (solo show)

2009

Workshop Report, Wiels, Brussels, cur. Dirk Snauwaert (solo show)
28. August, Galerie Peter Kilchmann, Zurich (solo show)
Workshop Report, Museion, Bolzano (solo show)
A GUEST + A HOST = A GHOST, Deste Foundation, Athens

2008

My Bike and Your Swamp, Camden Art Center, London (solo show)
My Bike and Your Swamp, Hallen Haarlem, Haarlem, cur. Xander Karskens (solo show)
Sunset, Le Magasin CNAC, Grenoble, cur. Yves Aupetitallot (solo show)
Expenditure, Busan Biennale, Korea, cur. Tom Morton
Life on Mars, The 2008 Carnegie International, cur. Douglas Fogle 
Blue Mirror, Gladstone Gallery, New York (solo show)
Fractured Figure, Deste Foundation, Athens

2007

Interlude, Galerie Peter Kilchmann, Zurich (solo show)
The Hydra Workshops, Hydra, cur. Sadie Coles (solo show)
Wait to Wait, Museum Boijmans van Beuningen, Rotterdam, cur. Rein Wolfs (solo show)
Everyday is Saturday, Tbilisi Center for Contemporary Art, Tbilisi, cur. Daniel Baumann

2006

I’m sorry if I’m not very funny tonights, Kunstmuseum Winterthur, cur. Dieter Schwarz (solo show)
Printemps de Septembre, Toulouse, cur. Mirjam Varadinis
Without Mirror, Gladstone Gallery, New York (solo show)
Of Mouse and Men, 4th Berlin Biennale, Berlin, cur. Maurizio Cattelan, Massimiliano Gioni, Ali Subotnick

2005

Expanded Painting, Prague Biennale 2, cur. Helena Kontova & Giancarlo Politi
Lively Memories, Plattform, Berlin, cur. Aurélie Voltz
Del Rio, Shirana Shahbazi & Andro Wekua, Zimmerfrei, Lugano, cur. Giovanni Carmine

2004

That would have been wonderful, Neue Kunst Halle St. Gallen, St. Gallen, cur. Gianni Jetzer (solo show)
Punktleuchten, Hotel 3 Könige, Basel, cur. Klaus Littmann
Fürchte Dich, Helmhaus Zürich, Zurich, cur. Gianni Jetzer & Simon Maurer
Emotion Eins, Frankfurter Kunstverein, Frankfurt, cur. Nicolaus Schafhausen

Monographs and artist's books
Andro Wekua / Rita Ackermann : Chapter 2, Nieves, Zurich, 2003
Andro Wekua / Rita Ackermann : Chapter 3, Nieves, Zurich, 2005
Andro Wekua: ...no one was there, she did not know it..., Nieves, Zurich, 2005
Andro Wekua: Shadows on the Facade, Nieves, Zurich, 2007
Andro Wekua: The Hydra Workshops, Sadie Coles, London, 2007
Andro Wekua: That Would Have Been Wonderful, Patrick Frey Verlag, 2005
Andro Wekua: If there ever was one, Kunstmuseum Winterthur, JRP-Ringier, 2006
Andro Wekua:  Workshop Report, Walther König Verlag, Köln, 2009,
Andro Wekua / Boris Groys: Wait to Wait, Christoph Keller Editions, JRP Ringier, Zurich, 2009
Andro Wekua / Ketuta Alexi: Anywhere Anyhow, PamBook, Melbourne, Australia, 2009

References

External links
Wekua in conversation with Boris Groys in Fillip
Wekua’s artist book
Images, biography and texts from the Saatchi Gallery
Andro Wekua on ArtFacts.net
Further information from Gladstone Gallery
Andro Wekua on ArtNet.com
Interview with Andro Wekua about his exhibit at the 55th Carnegie International

Artists from Georgia (country)
Living people
1977 births
People from Sukhumi
Swiss contemporary artists